Kazakhstan participated at the 2015 Summer Universiade, in Gwangju, South Korea.

Medals by sport

Medalists

References

External links
 Country Overview Kazakhstan

Nations at the 2015 Summer Universiade
2015